Nancy Worman (born 1963) is Professor of Classics at Barnard and Columbia University. She is an expert on ancient Greek drama and oratory, on ancient literary criticism and literary theory, and on the reception of ancient Greece in the post-classical world.

Career 
Worman was educated at Barnard College, where she received her BA; she later received her PhD from Princeton University. She is currently Professor of Classics and Comparative Literature at Barnard College, where she has taught since 1996. She was awarded an Ann Whitney Olin Professorship in the academic year 2015–2016.

Selected publications 
Landscape and the Spaces of Metaphor in Ancient Literary Theory and Criticism. Cambridge University Press (2015).
Place, Space, and Landscape in Ancient Greek Literature and Culture, ed.K. Gilhuly and N. Worman. Cambridge University Press (2014).
Abusive Mouths in Classical Athens. Cambridge University Press (2008).
The Cast of Character: Style in Greek Literature. University of Texas Press (2002).
"Euripides, Aristophanes, and Sophistic Style." In The Blackwell Companion to Euripides, ed. L. McClure (Blackwell, 2017), 517–32.
"What Is 'Greek Sex' For?" In Ancient Sex: New Essays, ed. R. Blondell and K. Ormand (Ohio State University Press, 2015), 208–30.
"The Aesthetics of Ancient Landscapes." In A Companion to Ancient Aesthetics, Blackwell Companions to the Ancient World, ed. P. Destrée and P. Murray (Blackwell, 2015), 291–306.

References

Living people
Barnard College alumni
Women classical scholars
Princeton University alumni
Barnard College faculty
1963 births